There have been 22 head coaches in the history of the New York Jets football franchise. The team began as the New York Titans in the American Football League in 1960, but was renamed the New York Jets three years later. The Jets remained in the American Football League until the merger with the National Football League prior to the 1970 season. The current head coach of the Jets is Robert Saleh since January 14, 2021.

Sammy Baugh became the first head coach of the New York Titans in 1960, serving for two seasons before team owner Harry Wismer replaced him with Clyde "Bulldog" Turner. In terms of tenure, Weeb Ewbank has coached more games (158) and more complete seasons (11) than any other head coach in franchise history. He led the Jets to the AFL championship in 1968 and the AFL-NFL championship in Super Bowl III. Walt Michaels led the team to the AFC championship game in 1982; he was also honored as the Pro Football Weekly NFL Coach of the Year and UPI AFC Coach of the Year in 1978. Coaches Baugh, Turner and Ewbank are all members of the Pro Football Hall of Fame; Baugh and Turner were inducted as players, while Ewbank was inducted as a coach/administrator.

Twice in Jets history has there been an "interim" head coach. In 1975, Charley Winner was fired as head coach after leading the Jets to a 2–7 record. The team offensive coordinator Ken Shipp was named the interim coach for the remainder of the season, during which he won only one of five games. Shipp was succeeded by Lou Holtz for the 1976 season. Holtz resigned as Jets head coach with one game left in the 1976 season; Mike Holovak was named interim coach for the season finale against the Cincinnati Bengals.

Bill Belichick was twice named head coach of the Jets but never coached a single game or practice in that capacity. In 1997, he was named head coach for six days before the deal to allow Bill Parcells to leave the New England Patriots for the Jets was brokered, and Belichick became defensive coordinator; then, when Parcells stepped down after the 1999 season Belichick was named to replace him, but resigned the next day.

Herman Edwards is the only Jets head coach to lead the team to the playoffs more than twice; Rex Ryan is the only one with more than two postseason wins. Todd Bowles is the only one to coach the Jets for more than two seasons without making the playoffs.

Key

Coaches

Footnotes

The Win–loss percentage is calculated using the formula: 
Ken Shipp was the interim head coach for five games in the 1975 season.
Holtz resigned as Jets head coach 13 games into the season; he was replaced by Mike Holovak for the last game of the season.
Holovak coached the last game of the 1976 season, after Lou Holtz had resigned as Jets head coach.

References
General

Specific

 
New York Jets
Head coaches